Jan Hanuš (born 28 April 1988) is a Czech footballer, who currently plays for FK Jablonec as a goalkeeper.

International career
Hanuš was called up to the Czech Republic under-21 squad for the 2011 UEFA European Under-21 Championship.

External links
 
 
 

1988 births
Living people
People from Chlumec nad Cidlinou
Czech footballers
Czech Republic under-21 international footballers
Association football goalkeepers
Czech First League players
SK Slavia Prague players
FC Hlučín players
FC Hradec Králové players
FC Sellier & Bellot Vlašim players
FC Vysočina Jihlava players
FK Jablonec players
Sportspeople from the Hradec Králové Region